Noble (also known as Noble600) is a production studio based in Los Angeles, California. The studio focuses primarily on producing television advertisements, mainly animated ones. It also produces music videos, short films and web content. Noble offers a wide range of services, including live action and integration, character design, film title design, 2D and 3D animation, digital compositing, digital/traditional ink & paint. The studio was co-founded by Mark Medernach and Paul Dektor.

Filmography

Commercials

7 Up
American Greetings
American Express
Anheuser-Busch
Applebee's
Bank One Corporation
Bell Atlantic
Ben & Jerry's
Black Star Beer
Blimpie
Bob's Stores
CalArts
Chiquita
The Coca-Cola Company
Comcast
Cox Communications
El Pollo Loco
El Torito
Energizer
Foot Locker
Fox Family Channel (1998)
Game Show Network (1999)
General Motors
Giant Markets
Griffith Observatory
HBO (1986, 1999)
H&R Block
Healthtex
H-E-B
The Hershey Company
Hoosier Lottery
Idaho Potato Commission
Indiana State Fair
IndustryWeek
Jack's
JCPenney
Juicy Juice (1997)
Kaiser Aluminum
Kellogg's (1970s-1998)
Lancers
Levi Strauss & Co.
M&M's (2003-2004)
Mattel
McDonald's
Molina Healthcare
Nesbitt's
Nestlé (1997-1999)
The New York Times
Nike
Nissan
Pentel of America
PepsiCo
Pfizer
POM Wonderful
Post Consumer Brands
Public Storage
Ralphs
Regional Transportation Authority
Ronald McDonald House Charities
Roundy's
Scottish Rite Hospital
Starkist
Tetley
Toyota
TurboTax
United Airlines
UnitedHealth Group
United States Olympic Committee
United States Postal Service
Walmart
Walt Disney Parks and Resorts
Wienerschnitzel
The Wherehouse
Winstar Communications
Zicam

Awards
Won the 36th Annual Annie Award for Best Animated Television Commercial for United Airlines "Heart" directed by Jamie Caliri.
Won the 34th Annual Annie Award for Best Animated Television Commercial for United Airlines "Dragon" directed by Jamie Caliri.
Won the 2010 Rising Star Award at the Canada International Film Festival for Rubbuds, directed by Jan Chen.
Won the 2009 Emmy for Best Main Title Design for United States of Tara
Won the 2009 Clio Award (Silver) for Television Animation for United Airlines "Sea Orchestra" directed by The Blackheart Gang.
Won the 2009 Best Animated short film at the Naperville Independent Film Festival for Rubbuds, directed by Jan Chen.
Won the 2010 Best Animation at Las Vegas International Film Festival for Rubbuds, directed by Jan Chen.
Won the 22nd Annual Annie Award (1994) for Best Animated Television Commercial for Coca-Cola "Sax Man".

Roster of directors
Dadomani
Paul Dektor
Hsinping Pan
John Robertson
Lane Nakamura and Jan Chen
Paper Panther
Mainframe
Oh Yeah Wow
Oliver Conrad
Paloma
Screen Novelties
SMOG
Tiny Inventions

References

External links
 

American animation studios